"I Just Can't Let Go" is a song by David Pack, featuring Michael McDonald and James Ingram. It was released as a single in 1986 and was the third of three charting singles released from Pack's debut solo album, Anywhere You Go.

The song reached No. 13 on the U.S. Billboard Adult Contemporary chart during the fall of 1986.  It spent 11 weeks on the chart.  The song describes the estrangement of a lying lover to whom the singer had given his "heart and soul," yet still constantly remembering the love they lost, wondering if the guilty one is feeling the same, and leaving the door open for reconciliation.

"I Just Can't Let Go" was re-recorded in 1996 by Ambrosia together with Pack (the band having reunited in 1989) for their 1997 Anthology compilation. It was released as a single that year and reached No. 26 on the Adult Contemporary chart. This version was re-arranged and produced by Pack, Oliver Leiber, and Shaun LaBelle, as a bonus track. The original vocals were kept, but Pack and McDonald added new vocal improvisation, while the sax solo was added by Everette Harp.

In 2019, Pack re-mixed and re-mastered the original 1985 recording of this song to create a new video. The demo vocals of Ingram, McDonald, and Pack were restored, digitized, and then used as an a cappella intro of the video. The video was made after Pack found out that fans had created hundreds of videos of this song. Pack was inspired then to create his own video, and dedicate it to Ingram.

Chart performance

David Pack version

Ambrosia version

Other versions
Patti Austin covered the song for her 1991 album Carry On.
A popular song in the Philippines, it has been covered by several local singers including Jed Madela, Rachelle Ann Go and Jaya.

References

External links
 Lyrics of this song
 

1985 songs
1986 singles
1997 singles
Warner Records singles
Songs written by David Pack
James Ingram songs
Michael McDonald (musician) songs
Torch songs